The 1955 Cornell Big Red football team was an American football team that represented Cornell University as an independent during the 1955 college football season. In its ninth season under head coach George K. James, the team compiled a 5–4 record and outscored its opponents 159 to 134. Dick Jackson was the team captain. 

This would be Cornell's final year as a football independent, as the Ivy League, which Cornell had helped co-found in 1954, began football competition in 1956. All seven Ivy League opponents appeared on Cornell's 1955 schedule; the Big Red had been playing most of their games against (future) Ivy teams for decades.

Cornell played its home games at Schoellkopf Field in Ithaca, New York.

Schedule

References

Cornell
Cornell Big Red football seasons
Cornell Big Red football